María Islands (Spanish: Islas Marías) is a 1951 Mexican drama film directed by Emilio Fernández and starring Pedro Infante, Rosaura Revueltas, and Rocío Sagaón.

Cast
 Pedro Infante as Felipe Ortiz Suárez  
 Rosaura Revueltas as Rosa Suárez vda. de Ortiz  
 Rocío Sagaón as María 
 Esther Luquín as Alejandra  
 Jaime Fernández as Ricardo  
 Arturo Soto Rangel as Miguel  
 Julio Villarreal as Rector escuela militar  
 Rodolfo Acosta as El Silencio 
 Tito Junco as General 
 Luis Aceves Castañeda as Detective de policía  
 Julio Ahuet as Taxista  
 Daniel Arroyo as Invitado a fiesta  
 Josefina Burgos as Florista 
 Margarita Ceballos as Margarita  
 Aurora Cortés as Sirvienta  
 José Escanero as Vecino  
 Rogelio Fernández as Alguacil  
 Georgina González as Espectadora marcha militar
 Gilberto González 
 Emilio Gálvez
 Leonor Gómez as Cocinera Islas Marias  
 Elodia Hernández as Parienta de prisionero  
 Regino Herrera as Preso  
 Felipe Montoya as Lic. González  
 Yolanda Ortiz as Cabaretera 
 Ignacio Peón as Actuario  
 Salvador Quiroz as Coronel 
 Humberto Rodríguez as Actuario  
 Jorge Treviño as Don Jorge  
 Hernán Vera as Don Venancio  
 Manuel Vergara 'Manver' as Borracho cabaret

References

Bibliography 
 Juanita Heredia. Transnational Latina Narratives in the Twenty-first Century. Palgrave Macmillan, 2009.

External links 
 

1951 films
1951 drama films
Mexican drama films
1950s Spanish-language films
Films directed by Emilio Fernández
Mexican black-and-white films
1950s Mexican films